Cecil Frank Isbell (July 11, 1915 – June 23, 1985) was an American football quarterback  and coach. He played 5 seasons in the National Football League (NFL) with the Green Bay Packers, leading them to the NFL Championship in 1939.  He retired after the 1942 season to become an assistant coach at his alma mater, Purdue University, and the following year became its head coach for three seasons.

Isbell was the head coach of the Baltimore Colts of the All-America Football Conference from 1947 to 1949, resigning after four winless games. He then became an assistant under former head coach Curly Lambeau, now with the Chicago Cardinals. When Lambeau resigned late in the 1951 season, Isbell was the interim head coach for the final two games, which they split. Isbell's pro head coaching record was 10–23–1. He was hired as an assistant coach with the Dallas Texans of the NFL in 1952. Isbell was inducted into the College Football Hall of Fame as a player in 1967.

Early life and college playing career
Born in Houston, Texas, Isbell was the second son of Adger and Sarah Isbell. His older brother Cody was also a football player for Purdue and his two younger brothers also played college football: William Adger "Dub" Isbell Jr. at Rice Institute and Larry Isbell at Baylor University.

Isbell attended Sam Houston High School in Houston, then went to Purdue, where played from 1935 through 1937. He was voted the Boilermakers' most valuable player for the 1937 season. In the summer of 1938, he led the College All-Stars to victory over the defending NFL champion Washington Redskins at Soldier Field in Chicago. Isbell was named the game's MVP as the All-Stars prevailed, 28–16.

NFL playing career
Isbell was selected in the first round of the 1938 NFL draft by the Green Bay Packers, the seventh overall pick.  When he arrived in Green Bay, the Packers already had an All-Pro tailback, Arnie Herber. who had led the Packers to the NFL championship in 1936. Coach Curly Lambeau alternated Isbell and Herber and occasionally used them in the same backfield, with Isbell at halfback. This "platooning" allowed Isbell to learn Lambeau's offense, the Notre Dame Box. Isbell was a very accurate passer and a good runner and he led the Packers in rushing and passing in his rookie year. The Packers came in first in the West and faced the New York Giants in the championship game at the Polo Grounds. Isbell rushed 11 times for 20 yards and was 3 of 5 passing for 91 yards, but the Giants prevailed, 23–17. In 1939, the Packers used the same attack and again Isbell led the team in rushing while catching 9 passes as well. The Packers again won the Western division and faced New York in a rematch from the year before. This time the game was played in Milwaukee and Green Bay crushed the Giants, 27–0, with Isbell throwing a 27-yard touchdown pass.

From 1940 to 1942, the Packers finished second in the West to the Chicago Bears each year. Isbell became a more accomplished passer during this time, connecting regularly with Don Hutson in record-setting frequency. In 1941, Isbell set an NFL record for yards passing with 1,479 and led the league in completion percentage (56.8%) and touchdown passes with 15 (10 to Hutson). The Packers finished the season tied with Chicago, but lost to the Bears in a divisional tiebreaker playoff, 33–14. In 1942, Isbell surpassed his own record with 2,021 yards passing and set a new record with 24 touchdown passes. Hutson also set NFL records with 74 receptions, 1,211 yards receiving and 17 touchdowns (Hutson's touchdown mark was matched by Elroy Hirsch in 1951 and stood until 1984). Still, the Packers finished second to Chicago, who were 11–0 in the regular season.

After the 1942 season, Isbell quit the NFL after just 5 years, He finished with 5,945 yards passing, 61 touchdowns, and 52 interceptions. According to Isbell, he retired because he'd been offered a coaching job and he thought it was too good an offer to pass up. He later admitted that accepting the coaching job was a mistake, saying, "If it means anything to anyone, I should've kept playing."

Former NFL & Green Bay Packers record
Held the NFL record for most consecutive games with a touchdown pass with 23 games from 1940 to 1942. (These were the last 23 games of Isbell's career.) The record was later surpassed by Johnny Unitas in 1957 before Drew Brees eclipsed it in 2012. He held the Green Bay Packer record until it was later surpassed by Brett Favre in 2003.
First player to pass for 2,000 yards in a season in 1942.

The Professional  Football Researchers Association named Isbell to the PRFA Hall of Very Good Class of 2008  Isbell is one of ten players that were named to the National Football League 1930s All-Decade Team that have not been inducted into the Pro Football Hall of Fame.

Coaching career
Isbell started out at Purdue as an assistant coach in 1943 and took over as head coach in 1944. He coached there for three years with a 14–14–1 record. In 1947, he became a pro coach for the Baltimore Colts in the All-America Football Conference. He lasted for 2⅔ seasons, resigning prior to the fifth game in 1949. His one claim to fame from those years in the AAFC was he was the first coach of Y. A. Tittle, who went on to great success in the NFL. After a few more years as an assistant coach in the NFL coaching the Chicago Cardinals under head coach Curly Lambeau, and later the Dallas Texans, Isbell quit football for business in the mid 1950s.

Honors and death
Isbell was elected to the College Football Hall of Fame in 1967.  On June 23, 1985, Isbell died in Hammond, Indiana.  His tombstone gives his name as Cecil Fay Isbell.

Head coaching record

College

Pro

References

External links
 
 
 

1915 births
1985 deaths
American football quarterbacks
Baltimore Colts (1947–1950) coaches
Dallas Texans (NFL) coaches
Chicago Cardinals coaches
Green Bay Packers players
LSU Tigers football coaches
Purdue Boilermakers football coaches
Purdue Boilermakers football players
College Football Hall of Fame inductees
Sportspeople from Houston
Coaches of American football from Texas
Players of American football from Houston
Chicago Cardinals head coaches